The 2012 Paris–Roubaix was the 110th running of the Paris–Roubaix single-day cycling race, often known as the Hell of the North.

With  to go Boonen had made a breakaway with teammate Niki Terpstra, but the latter quickly proved unable to follow the Belgian. Boonen continued solo to win in Roubaix by over a minute and a half.

Teams 
Riders from 25 teams took part in the 2012 Paris–Roubaix. These are:

Teams for Paris-Roubaix

Wild Cards

Results

See also 
 2012 in road cycling

References

Paris–Roubaix
Paris-Roubaix
Paris-Roubaix
Paris-Roubaix